Toshiko Matsuo (14 July 1907 – 3 June 1993) was a Japanese politician. She was one of the first group of women elected to the House of Representatives in 1946, serving in parliament until 1958.

Biography
Born in Yokohama in 1907, Matsuo was educated at Ferris Japanese-English Girls' School. She became an English teacher at the Yokohama YMCA and established her own school, which later became the Japan Women's English Academy.

Matsuo contested the 1946 general elections as a Japan Socialist Party candidate in Kanagawa, and was elected to the House of Representatives. She was re-elected in 1947, 1949, 1952, 1953 and 1955 and became a member of the party's central executive committee. In 1948 Finance Minister  was forced to resign after attempting to kiss Matsuo and Harue Yamashita.

After losing her seat in the 1958 elections, Matsuo unsuccessfully contested the 1960 elections as a Democratic Socialist Party candidate. She later joined the Liberal Democratic Party and became an advisor in Kanagawa Prefecture, as well as serving as chair of the Yokohama Citizens' Credit Union and president of the Matsuo Kosan company. She died in 1993.

References

1907 births
People from Yokohama
Japanese educators
20th-century Japanese women politicians
20th-century Japanese politicians
Members of the House of Representatives (Japan)
Social Democratic Party (Japan) politicians
Democratic Socialist Party (Japan) politicians
1993 deaths